The first North Head Lighthouse on the northern side of the Saldanha Bay entrance, in South Africa, was a 300mm AGA acetylene gas lantern mounted on a square concrete pillar, installed on December 7, 1939. It had a small diaphone fog signal.

A new aluminium tower came into operation on 1969-12-02, about 100 metres from the previous lighthouse. The fully automatic revolving electric optic is powered by triple mutual diesel/alternator sets. The lighthouse is monitored at Cape Columbine.

See also

 List of lighthouses in South Africa
 Almost identical South Head Lighthouse, Saldanha Bay

References

External links
 Picture of Saldanha Bay North Head

Lighthouses completed in 1939
Lighthouses completed in 1969
Lighthouses in South Africa
Buildings and structures in the Western Cape
West Coast District Municipality